Dogfights is a military aviation themed TV series depicting historical re-enactments of air-to-air combat that took place in World War I, World War II, the Korean War, and the Vietnam War, as well as smaller conflicts such as the Gulf War and the Six-Day War. The program consists of former fighter pilots sharing their stories of actual dogfights in which they took part, combined with computer-generated imagery (CGI) to give the viewer a better perspective of what it is like to engage in aerial combat.

Historical documentary format
These episodes have been cited as a source for several English Wikipedia articles, such as the Battle of Leyte Gulf. Simulated models include views from the cockpit, pilots visible through canopies, and battle damage. Orders of battle, comparisons of aircraft, and dissections of particular maneuvers are also presented. Jet and prop powered aircraft and ships from various eras from the First World War to the late 20th century are featured.

Creation of the series
The series was created after the airing of a one-time special called Dogfights: The Greatest Air Battles in September 2005. That program's combination of realistic-looking CGI dogfights, interviews, period documentary footage, and voice-over narration proved so successful, that the History Channel requested the production of an entire TV series, which became Dogfights. The original special continues to air occasionally and has been recently updated to reflect the current series logo.

Overview
In each episode, true historical dogfights of a certain battle or war are played out. Pilots from the actual fights are brought in to re-tell their accounts of the battles. Along with the battle, there are occasional scenes that describe the pilot's living conditions or events that have happened outside the battle. Each battle is told by the pilot and a special narrator. CGI effects are used, providing a realistic simulation. The show also describes the aircraft, showing diagrams on screen and taking some time to describe the advantages and disadvantages of each plane. It also describes and illustrates the air maneuvers and tactics used by the pilots. Usually, the battles are told by pilots of the winning side of each war or battle. Occasionally, there are other variants brought into a battle besides the planes. For example, a pilot may recount their experience destroying ship fleets, bombing enemy air fields, or dealing with Anti Aircraft fire from the ground, but the process is interrupted by enemy planes. After each battle, the show usually features a short biography about the pilots and the conflicts they were involved in, and then the credits roll.

Episode list

Pilot episode

Season one

Season two

DVDs

From 2007 to 2009, The History Channel Home Entertainment released the series on Region 1 DVD.

Dogfights - The Complete Season One DVD set was released on April 24, 2007. Featuring all eleven episodes, it also includes the original pilot episode and a behind-the-scenes featurette called "Dogfights: The Planes." The picture format is 4:3 (1.33:1) even though the series was produced in anamorphic 16:9 widescreen.

Dogfights - The Complete Season Two 5 DVD set was released on June 24, 2008.

Dogfights - The Complete Series All the episodes including Dogfights of the Future are included in a 10 DVD set,  which was released on October 27, 2009.

The game
Starting with season 2, the History Channel produced, in conjunction with Kuma Reality Games, a free PC video game based on the Dogfights series. Dogfights: The Game puts players in interactive recreations of actual episodes from the TV show. As of now the game primarily concentrates on the World War II episodes of the series. This can be found on History.com

See also

 The History Channel
 Greatest Tank Battles
Shootout!
The Lost Evidence
 Dogfight
 Flying ace
 Dogfights: The Game
 Battle 360°

References

External links
Dogfights official website on the History Channel
Dogfights video clips on the History Channel
Episodes for Dogfights on the History Channel
Episodes for Dogfights on IMDB
Dogfights official video game on History.com
 

2000s American documentary television series
2006 American television series debuts
2008 American television series endings
Aerial warfare
American military television series
Aviation television series
Documentary television series about aviation
English-language television shows
History (American TV channel) original programming